Kalapana was a High Chief who lived in ancient Hawaii.

Kalapana is also known as Kalapanakuʻioʻiomoa and Kalapaua. Kalapanakuʻioʻiomoa is his longest name that includes the nickname. He is commonly known as either Kalapa or Kalapana.

Family 
Kalapana was possibly a son of Prince Kanaloa and his sister Makoʻani, who are the children of Hualani of Molokai and Chief Kanipahu. Kalapana married Malamaʻihanaʻae and their son was Chief Kahaimoelea.

Reign 

According to the legends, Kalapana was a successor of the cruel Chief Kamaiole.

References 

Hawaiian chiefs
House of Pili